Innocent Country 2 is the second collaborative studio album by American rapper Quelle Chris and record producer Chris Keys. It was released on April 24, 2020 via Mello Music Group, serving as a sequel to their 2015 album Innocent Country and the fourth in the Quelle's 2Dirt4TV series. It features guest appearances from Merrill Garbus, Cavalier, Denmark Vessey, Earl Sweatshirt, Homeboy Sandman, and comedians Josh Gondelman and James Acaster, among others.

Critical reception

Paul Simpson of AllMusic gave the album 3.5 stars out of 5, commenting that "Keys' productions are generally clean and polished, filled with jazzy pianos and warm rhythms rather than the more disjointed sample-choppery of before" and that "Quelle's rhymes focus on maintaining sanity and happiness throughout all of life's obstacles, and while these are easily his most mature lyrics to date, he still injects the album with plenty of satire and surrealism."

On June 29, 2020, NPR Music included it on the "25 Favorite Albums of 2020 (So Far)" list.

Track listing

Personnel
Credits adapted from liner notes.

 Quelle Chris – main artist, co-producer, mixing, artwork
 Chris Keys – main artist, producer, mixing
 Dane Orr – mixing, mastering
 Skor Rokswell – artwork
 Cavalier – artwork, featured artist (3, 4)
 Ahmed Arasah – artwork
 Marcella Arguela – featured artist (2)
 Joseph Chilliams – featured artist (3)
 Merrill Garbus – featured artist (4, 13, 14)
 Homeboy Sandman – featured artist (4)
 Josh Gondelman – featured artist (6)
 Pink Siifu – featured artist (8)
 Billy Woods – featured artist (8)
 MosEL – featured artist (9)
 Nelson Bandela – featured artist (9)
 Dr. Tennille – featured artist (10)
 Starr Busby – featured artist (12)
 Melanie St. Charles – featured artist (13)
 Earl Sweatshirt – featured artist (14)
 Denmark Vessey – featured artist (14)
 Big Sen – featured artist (14)
 Nappy Nina – featured artist (15)
 Fresh Daily – featured artist (15)
 5ILL – featured artist (15)

References

External links
 

2020 albums
Sequel albums
Collaborative albums
Hip hop albums by American artists
Mello Music Group albums
Albums produced by Quelle Chris